Nanda Jichkar (born 1 February 1964) is an Indian politician.

Background and education
Jichkar was born on 1 February 1964 to a middle-class family in the Colonel Bagh, Nagpur. She completed her M.Sc. and M.Phil. in Statistics from Nagpur University. She also holds a Post Graduate Diploma in Computer Science (PGDCS), B.Ed (Education) and M.A. (Psychology))

Positions held
Jichkar is a two term corporator from Bhartiya Janata Party in Nagpur Municipal Corporation also served twice as the President of the Bharatiya Janata Party (BJP) Nagpur Women Wing (Nagpur BJP City President Mahila Aghadi). She served as the mayor of Nagpur Municipal Corporation from March 2017 to November 2019. She was a Member of Centre of Women's Studies and Development in Nagpur University. She is as well Vice President for Maharashtra State Mayor Council. She is the founding member of Mayor Innovation Council. Jichkar serves as a Board Member on Global Covenant of Mayors (GCOM) for Climate Action (chaired by Mr. Michael Bloomberg). She is currently also a Vice President of Regional Executive Committee (REXCom) for ICLEI South Asia.

Jichkar has been mentioned among 25 women leader across the world by National Geographic.

References

1964 births
Living people
Marathi politicians
Women mayors of places in Maharashtra
Bharatiya Janata Party politicians from Maharashtra
Mayors of places in Maharashtra
Mayors of Nagpur